Jiří Svoboda (24 December 1903 – 10 May 1937) was a Czech athlete. He competed in the men's javelin throw at the 1924 Summer Olympics.

References

External links
 

1903 births
1937 deaths
Athletes (track and field) at the 1924 Summer Olympics
Czech male javelin throwers
Olympic athletes of Czechoslovakia
Place of birth missing